Lisa Stadelbauer is the Canadian ambassador to Israel. Her past duties in Canada's Foreign Service include the posts of the High Commissioner to Kenya and Ambassador and Permanent Representative to the United Nations Environment Programme (UNEP) and to the United Nations Habitat Programme.  Because of her appointment as High Commissioner to Kenya, she is a non-resident High Commissioner to Rwanda and Uganda and Ambassador to Somalia and Burundi.,

A 1988 graduate of the University of Western Ontario with a BA in Administrative and Commercial Studies, Stadelbauer joined External Affairs and International Trade Canada in 1990. From 2011 to 2015, she served as ambassador to Zimbabwe and Angola and high commissioner in Botswana. Stadelbauer was appointed Canada's High Commissioner to Kenya in October 2018 and presented her credentials to President Uhuru Kenyatta on Wednesday, December 5, 2018.

References

High Commissioners of Canada to Kenya
University of Western Ontario alumni
Canadian women ambassadors
Ambassadors of Canada to Zimbabwe
Ambassadors of Canada to Angola
High Commissioners of Canada to Botswana
Ambassadors of Canada to Burundi
Ambassadors of Canada to Somalia
High Commissioners of Canada to Uganda
Ambassadors of Canada to Rwanda
Year of birth missing (living people)
Living people